Robert William Girardet (11 March 1893 – 1 March 1977) was a sailor from France, who represented his country at the 1924 Summer Olympics in Le Havre, France. Girardet took the bronze in the 8 Metre.

References

Sources
 

French male sailors (sport)
Sailors at the 1924 Summer Olympics – 8 Metre
Olympic sailors of France
1893 births
1977 deaths
Olympic bronze medalists for France
Olympic medalists in sailing
Sportspeople from Paris
Medalists at the 1924 Summer Olympics
20th-century French people